Panagiotis Trivoulidas (10 January 1891 – 1970) was a Greek long-distance runner. He competed in the marathon and the individual cross country events at the 1920 Summer Olympics.

References

1891 births
1970 deaths
Athletes (track and field) at the 1920 Summer Olympics
Greek male long-distance runners
Greek male marathon runners
Olympic athletes of Greece
Olympic cross country runners
Athletes from Piraeus